Cricetid gammaherpesvirus 2 (CrHV-2) is a species of virus in the genus Rhadinovirus, subfamily Gammaherpesvirinae, family Herpesviridae, and order Herpesvirales.

References 

Gammaherpesvirinae